The 1965 National Challenge Cup was the 52nd edition of the USSFA's annual open soccer championship. The New York Ukrainians defeated the Chicago Hansa to win.

Final

References
 

Lamar Hunt U.S. Open Cup
U.S. Open Cup
National Challenge Cup
National Challenge Cup